This is a list of barbecue dishes, comprising barbecued dishes and foods, along with those that are often barbecued.

Barbecue foods

 
 
 
 . It is also a term used both for a range of barbecue techniques and the social event of having or attending a barbecue
 
 
 
 
 
 
 
 
 
 
 
 
 
 
 
 
 
 
 
 
 

 
 
 
 
 
 
 
 
 
 
 Lechón/Leitão - Iberian roasted pork dish 
 . It is a dish in North African cuisine that consists of a whole sheep or a lamb spit-roasted on a barbecue

See also

 Barbecue restaurant
 Barbecue sauce
 List of meat dishes
 List of smoked foods
 List of spit-roasted foods
 Regional variations of barbecue

References

Dishes
Barbecue